Danny L. "Blue" Adams (born October 15, 1979) is a former American football cornerback who played for four seasons in the National Football League (NFL). After playing college football for Cincinnati, he was drafted by the Detroit Lions in the seventh round of the 2003 NFL Draft. During his professional career, Adams was also a member of the Jacksonville Jaguars, Chicago Bears, Rhein Fire, Tampa Bay Buccaneers, Cincinnati Bengals, Atlanta Falcons, and Montreal Alouettes. He is currently the defensive backs coach for the South Florida Bulls.

Early years
Adams is a 1997 graduate of Miami Senior High School in Miami, Florida, where he was a letterman in football.  As a senior, he won All-State Honorable Mention honors, and All-County first-team honors, and finished the year with four interceptions, four sacks, 69 tackles, two forced fumbles, and two fumble recoveries.

Coaching career
On February 10, 2012, Adams was hired by the Miami Dolphins as an assistant defensive backs coach. Prior to joining the Dolphins, he had served as a secondary coach at the University of Northern Iowa in 2011. In 2010, Adams served as a secondary coach at Purdue University.

On March 7, 2016, Adams returned to the collegiate level as the defensive backs coach for the West Virginia University Mountaineers.

On February 7, 2017, Adams was hired as the defensive backs coach for the South Florida Bulls football team.

References

1979 births
Living people
Miami Senior High School alumni
Players of American football from Miami
American football cornerbacks
Canadian football defensive backs
Cincinnati Bearcats football players
Detroit Lions players
Jacksonville Jaguars players
Chicago Bears players
Tampa Bay Buccaneers players
Rhein Fire players
Cincinnati Bengals players
Atlanta Falcons players
Montreal Alouettes players
Northern Iowa Panthers football coaches
Miami Dolphins coaches
Purdue Boilermakers football coaches
West Virginia Mountaineers football coaches
South Florida Bulls football coaches
Players of Canadian football from Miami
Sports coaches from Miami